Stephen P. Boyd is an American professor and control theorist. He is the Samsung Professor of Engineering, Professor in Electrical Engineering, and professor by courtesy in Computer Science and Management Science & Engineering at Stanford University. He is also affiliated with Stanford's Institute for Computational and Mathematical Engineering (ICME).

In 2014, Boyd was elected a member of the National Academy of Engineering for contributions to engineering design and analysis via convex optimization.

Academic biography

Education
Boyd received an AB degree in mathematics, summa cum laude, from Harvard University in 1980, and a PhD in electrical engineering and computer sciences from the University of California, Berkeley in 1985 under the supervision of Charles A. Desoer, S. Shankar Sastry and Leon Ong Chua. While at Berkeley, he was awarded a Hertz Fellowship (1982) and received the Hertz Thesis Prize (1985). In 2006 he was awarded an honorary doctorate from the Royal Institute of Technology in Stockholm, Sweden, and in 2017, from the Université catholique de Louvain in Belgium.

Career
Boyd joined the faculty of Stanford University's Electrical Engineering department in 1985. He regularly teaches undergraduate courses in applied linear algebra and machine learning. During his time at Stanford, he has been recognized with several teaching awards, including the 2016 Walter J. Gores Award for excellence in teaching, the school's highest teaching honor. He was awarded the 2017 IEEE James H. Mulligan Jr. Education Medal, in recognition of his efforts in education in the theory and application of optimization, which has sparked the writing of improved linear algebra and convex optimization textbooks. He has served as director of Stanford's Information Systems Laboratory, and as a visiting professor at universities including City University of Hong Kong, Massachusetts Institute of Technology, New York University, Royal Institute of Technology in Stockholm, and Katholieke Universiteit Leuven in Belgium. While at Stanford, he has consulted with numerous Silicon Valley tech companies, and founded one. His groups' CVXGEN software is used in SpaceX's Falcon 9 and Falcon Heavy to guide their autonomous precision landing.

Research
Boyd's primary research interests are convex optimization, especially applications in control, signal processing, machine learning, and finance. His PhD dissertation was on Volterra series descriptions of nonlinear circuits and devices. His primary focus then turned to automatic control systems, where he focused on applying convex optimization, specifically linear matrix inequalities (LMIs), to a variety of control system analysis and synthesis problems.

With Craig Barratt, he authored Linear Controller Design: Limits of Performance in 1991. In 1994, Boyd and Laurent El Ghaoui, Eric Feron, and Ragu Balakrishnan authored the book Linear Matrix Inequalities in System & Control Theory. Around 1999, he and Lieven Vandenberghe developed a PhD-level course and wrote the book Convex Optimization to introduce and apply convex optimization to other fields.

In 2005 he and Michael Grant developed the MATLAB open source software package CVX, which makes it easy to specify and solve convex optimization problems. This work earned them the 2012 Beale-Orchard-Hays Prize for Excellence in Computational Mathematical Programming. In 2012 he and Jacob Mattingley developed CVXGEN, which generates fast custom code for small, quadratic-programming-representable convex optimization problems, using an online interface. With minimal effort, it turns a mathematical problem description into a high-speed solver.

Open source software packages developed by his research group are widely used, and include,
 CVXPY, 
 SCS, first-order primal-dual cone solver for large problems 
 OSQP (with Oxford).
Boyd is ranked top 10 scientist in the field of Engineering and Technology.

Business and patents
Boyd co-founded and served as chief scientist of analog synthesis and intellectual property provider Barcelona Design, from its 1999 founding until it folded in 2005. He serves in an advisory capacity for BlackRock, an investment management corporation; Petuum, a machine learning platform for artificial intelligence; and H2O.ai, open source machine learning platform. He is also a co-inventor on 11 patents. On his personal website, which is visited more than 1.6 million times per year, he makes available papers, books, software, lecture notes and lecture videos.

Awards and honors 
 Hertz Foundation Fellow, 1980
 AACC Donald P. Eckman Award, 1992
 IEEE Fellow, 1999
 Mathematical Optimization Society Beale-Orchard-Hays Award, 2012
 IEEE Control Systems Award, 2013
 Member, US National Academy of Engineering, inducted 2014
 2014 INFORMS Saul Gass Expository Writing Award
 SIAM Fellow, 2015
 Walter J. Gores Award for Excellence in Teaching at Stanford, 2016
 INFORMS Fellow, 2016
 IEEE James H. Mulligan Jr. Education Medal, 2017
 Foreign Member, Chinese Academy of Engineering, 2017
 2019 Athanasios Papoulis Award, EURASIP
 Foreign Member, National Academy of Engineering of Korea (NAEK), 2020

Bibliography
 Introduction to Applied Linear Algebra - Vectors, Matrices, and Least Squares (Cambridge University Press, 2018) – with Lieven Vandenberghe (full book PDF by the authors)
 Convex Optimization (Cambridge University Press, 2004) – with Lieven Vandenberghe (full book PDF by the authors)
 Linear Matrix Inequalities in System and Control Theory (Society for Industrial and Applied Mathematics, 1994) – with Laurent El Ghaoui, Eric Feron and Vendataramanan Balakrishnan ( full book PDF by the copyright holders)
 Linear Controller Design: Limits of Performance (Prentice Hall, 1991) – with Craig H. Barratt ( full book PDF available from the authors)

References

External links
 
 Personal site: Books, Stephen P. Boyd
 Stephen P. Boyd executive profile on Bloomberg.com

Living people
People from Ann Arbor, Michigan
Harvard College alumni
UC Berkeley College of Engineering alumni
Stanford University Department of Electrical Engineering faculty
Control theorists
Members of the United States National Academy of Engineering
Fellow Members of the IEEE
Fellows of the Society for Industrial and Applied Mathematics
Year of birth missing (living people)
Foreign members of the Chinese Academy of Engineering
Fellows of the Institute for Operations Research and the Management Sciences
American electrical engineers